The KN-02 Toksa ( 毒蛇), Hwasong-11 is a North Korean reverse-engineered locally produced modification of the OTR-21 Tochka short-range ballistic missile.

Design and development
In 1983, Syria acquired a number of 9K79 Tochka (SS-21 Scarab-A) missiles from the Soviet Union, a single-stage, solid-propellant guided missile with a range of 70 km and a CEP of 160 m.  In 1996, Syrian missile technicians provided North Korea with technical data on the missiles, then shipped some of the missiles themselves.  The first test of a North Korean-produced version occurred in April 2004 and was a failure, but it was then successfully fired on 1 May 2005 into the Sea of Japan; the KN-02 has been tested at least 17 times.  Initial production is believed to have begun in 2006, with the missile displayed aboard a launcher during a military parade in April 2007, and entering service in 2008.  At least 50 missiles are speculated to be in service.

The KN-02 is a short-range, road-mobile ballistic missile, broadly equivalent to improved Scarab-B.  Although it has a shorter range than other North Korean missiles like the Scud-C, it has superior accuracy of near 100 meters CEP through inertial guidance with an optical correlation system in the terminal phase, making it the most accurate ballistic missile in the inventory; this enables it to be used for precision strikes against priority targets such as airfields, command posts, bridges, storage facilities, and even enemy troops concentrations in a tactical support role on the battlefield. Its warhead weighs  and likely consists of a high-explosive, submunition, thermonuclear, chemical payload; Russian engineers could equip the OTR-21 with a 100 kiloton nuclear warhead.

A significant difference between the Russian OTR-21 and North Korean KN-02 is the transporter erector launcher (TEL). The vehicle has a short firing cycle, able to be ready for launch in 16 minutes, launch the missile in 2 minutes, and be reloaded in 20 minutes by a supporting reloader vehicle of the same design fitted with a crane and holding 2-4 more missiles.

Further developments

In 2013, South Korean intelligence reports suggested that North Korea was developing an anti-ship ballistic missile version of the KN-02. Its range is estimated to be , longer than current KN-01 variants, and it would be much more difficult to intercept due to its faster speed.

In March 2014, a South Korean military source claimed that the KN-02's range had been extended to  through improved engine performance. The source also claimed that North Korea possessed 100 missiles with 30 TELs deployed to fire them.

Extended range Hwasong-11/KN-02 is referred to as KN-10. It is expected that range of the missile is greater than 230 kilometers.

The U.S. identified the KN-10 system back in 2010.

Operators

See also 
OTR-21 Tochka

References 

Short-range ballistic missiles
Tactical ballistic missiles of North Korea
Theatre ballistic missiles
Chemical weapon delivery systems
Military equipment introduced in the 2000s